The 1999 Carolina Panthers season was the franchise's 5th season in the National Football League and the 1st and under head coach George Seifert who replaced Dom Capers as head coach. They improved upon their 4–12 record in 1998, and the Panthers went 8–8, their first .500 record in franchise history, but failed to make the playoffs for the fourth time in franchise history.

Offseason

NFL Draft 

The 1999 NFL Draft took place at Radio City Music Hall in New York City on April 17 and April 18, 1999. The Panthers selected five players in seven rounds. They traded their first-round pick to the Washington Redskins in partial payment for the signing of Sean Gilbert.

Staff

Roster

Schedule

Standings

References 

Carolina Panthers seasons
Carolina Panthers
Carolina